"The Bridge of San Luis Rey" was an American television play broadcast by CBS on January 21, 1958, as part of the television series, DuPont Show of the Month. It was written by Ludi Claire as an adaptation of the Thornton Wilder novel. Robert Mulligan was the director and David Susskind the producer.

Plot
The teleplay is set in the early 1700s in Peru. An old rope bridge over a gorge collapses, killing five persons. Brother Juniper conducts a lengthy investigation of the lives and backgrounds of the five victims. The play follows Juniper's investigation and examines the lives prior to the accident.

A church council then examines Brother Juniper's book recounting his findings and determines the book to be heresy.  Both Brother Juniper and his book are publicly burned.

Cast
The cast included performances by:

 Judith Anderson as Marquesa de Montemayor
 Hume Cronyn as Uncle Pio
 Steven Hill as Esteban
 Viveca Lindfors as Camilla, la Perichole
 Kurt Kasznar as Don Andres, the Viceroy
 Theodore Bikel as Capt. Alvarado
 Rita Gam as Dona Clara, Marquesa's daughter
 Peter Cookson
 Eva Le Gallienne as the Abbess, Madre Maria
 Clifford David
 Sandra Whiteside as Pepita, the Marquesa's Indian maid
 William Marshall
 Miko Oscard

Production
The program was broadcast by CBS on January 21, 1958, as part of the television series, DuPont Show of the Month. Robert Mulligan was the director. The production was reported to have used a record number of cameras and was watched by a 47% share of the available audience.

Actress Ludi Claire adapted Thornton Wilder's novel for television. Jack Gould in The New York Times credited Claire with a bold approach and "extraordinary craftsmanship."  Claire ended up winning the 1958 Sylvania Television Award for best television adaptation. The production also received a Sylvania nomination as the year's outstanding telecast and two nominations for outstanding actress for the performances of Judith Anderson and Viveca Lindfors.

Judith Anderson was also nominated for an Emmy Award in the category of best single performance by an actress.

Reception
In The New York Times, Jack Gould praised the production's "quality, taste and competence", and called the performances magnificent, singling out Judith Anderson and Eva Le Galliene in particular. Gould added: "Television has not known many such moments."

William Ewald of the United Press found it to be disappointing. Though he found it far better than most TV fare, he concluded that it never succeeded in exploring the book's central theme about man's need for love.

References

1958 television plays
American television films